Converse Basin Grove is a grove of giant sequoia (Sequoiadendron giganteum) trees in the Giant Sequoia National Monument in the Sierra Nevada, in Fresno County, California, 5 miles (8 km) north of General Grant Grove, just outside Kings Canyon National Park. Once home to the second-largest population of giant sequoias in the world, covering  acres, the grove was extensively logged by the Sanger Lumber Company at the turn of the 20th century. 
The clearcutting of 8,000 giant sequoias, many of which were over 2,000 years old, resulted in the destruction of the old-growth forest ecosystem.

The Converse Basin Grove has not recovered despite attempts at restoration in the 20th century. The planting of single-species conifer plantations and the practice of fire exclusion has resulted in two high intensity wildfires since the end of the logging era, further degrading the giant sequoia habitat. Despite these challenges, the grove offers opportunities for studying forest resilience and restoration efforts.

Converse Basin Grove is home to several notable giant sequoia trees, including the Boole Tree, the sixth largest of its kind in the world, and the Chicago Stump, the remains of the General Noble Tree which was cut down for the 1893 World's Columbian Exposition. Another notable tree in the grove is the Muir Snag, which is believed to have been 3,500 years old at the time of its death, making it one of the oldest known giant sequoias.

History

Eponym 
Converse Basin was named after Charles Porter Converse. Converse was a founder of the Kings River Lumber Company and had planned to log the area in the 1860s. However, an economic recession interrupted Converse's plans. He left the company shortly after its founding.

Logging Era 

Converse Basin was once the world's second-largest giant sequoia grove before it was logged of most of its giant sequoias between 1892–1918. The Kings River Lumber Company was refinanced as the Sanger Lumber Company and began logging the grove. They engaged in destructive clearcutting practices, cutting down 8,000 giant sequoias in a decade-long event that has been described as "the greatest orgy of destructive lumbering in the history of the world." Only 60-100 large specimens survived.

Conservation Movement 
In the 1870s, the threat to Converse Basin motivated conservationists to take action. Colonel George W. Stewart, a newspaper publisher and editor, played a crucial role in linking local efforts to preserve giant sequoias to the national conservation movement. As a result, Sequoia, General Grant, and Yosemite National Parks were established in 1890.  However, federal protection for the Converse Basin Grove came too late. The area did not receive federal protected from logging until it was designated as part of Sequoia National Monument through a presidential proclamation by Bill Clinton in April 2000.

Environmental Impact 
The logging of giant sequoias in Converse Basin resulted in the collapse of the old-growth forest ecosystem needed to sustain them. In 1915, Henry Seidel Canby wrote evocatively of the destruction in Harper's Monthly.  

It lay, a great bowl, open and near the sky, views down from its southern rim to the great plain, an edge of forest cresting it to the north.  All within was a vast and lonely cemetery.  A stream wound among broken trunks, torn roots, and whitened slabs of lumber, through the midst of the grassy valley. Above the thin turf rose weathered pines or clumps of feathery sequoia, like Italian cypresses, and beneath and beside them, at decorous intervals, were the great tombs of the dead sequoia. 

They were only stumps, but in that melancholy landscape stumps like these had power over the imagination.  The bark had long since gone from them, but the wood held firm and fast.  Ten feet, fifteen feet, twenty feet, they rose above the ground, and two of us could lie head-to-head upon the tops as we pored over their thousand years of rings. 

Twenty years had brought back beauty to this wasted valley, though beauty of a strange and melancholy sort. Flowers were everywhere, most of all where the little stream at intervals drew over its ripples a canopy of pink azalea, now in fullest bloom.  But the forest had gone. An indiscriminate slaughter had let in the sun, its enemy; had dried the springs, which were its lifeblood; and such tearing and ripping as we had seen at Hume had rendered the soil, its mother, unfit except for barren grass. A few lonely redwoods, spared out of wantonness, had done their best to plant the spaces, but the younglings near them could only patch the ground; the pines and firs had well-nigh given up the struggle. Ranging cattle were more than a match for Nature and her seedling trees. In the great stumps themselves, in blocks and fragments scattered over the soil, in the logs which choked the streams, was more dead and wasted lumber than a forester could hope to grow on so many acres in a hundred years. The story of the Appalachians was being told again, and more loudly.

In the 1930s, Sequoia National Park commissioner Walter Fry and superintendent John R. White, “marveled that man had been able by crude methods to do so much damage.”

Ecosystem Management 
Converse Basin has not recovered over a century after it was overlogged. In an attempt to restore the forest, single-species conifer plantations were planted. However, these plantations have been unsuccessful and have caused more harm than good. They are prone to pine beetles and have disrupted the local water cycle, leading to an increase in dead trees and dense fuel loads. These conditions have increased the risk of wildfire.

Wildfire

Two wildfires have occurred in Converse Basin since logging stopped in 1918. The first, the McGee Fire, burned all the young sequoias in Converse Basin and threatened the Boole Tree in 1955. This event led to the realization of the dangers of suppressing fires and the benefits of prescribed burns. The second wildfire, the Rough Fire, occurred in 2015 and re-burned an area affected by the McGee Fire. However, no trees of exceptional size or historical significance were harmed.

Hiking and Recreation
There are three main trails in Converse Grove: Boole Tree Trail, Chicago Stump Trail, and Stump Meadow.
 The Boole Tree Trail is a moderate  loop with restroom facilities but no drinkable water, offering views of the Kings River gorge and the Sierra Nevada mountains. The trail passes through a forest of white fir, oaks, incense cedar, and a few young sequoias.
The Chicago Stump Trail is an easy  loop that winds through a meadow with young sequoias and leads to the remains of a tree called the Chicago Stump. 
Stump Meadow is a meadow filled with sequoia stumps left over from historic logging and is surrounded by young sequoias that are about 100 years old. Scientists are studying why this area has not regenerated like the rest of the grove.

Noteworthy trees
Some of the trees found in the grove that are worthy of special note are:
Boole Tree: Before 1931, it was believed by some that the Boole Tree was the largest tree in the world, although the General Grant Tree was more widely recognized as the largest at that time. It is the largest giant sequoia on National Forest System lands.

Chicago Stump: the remnant of the General Noble Tree which was cut for the 1893 World's Columbian Exposition. The General Noble Tree was the second-largest tree in the grove. Although not among the very largest giant sequoias, the General Noble Tree was perhaps among the top 30 largest giant sequoias before it was cut.
Muir Snag: The Muir Snag is one of the largest and tallest standing dead trees in the world. It is believed to be over 3,200 years old when it died. The tree is named for naturalist John Muir who described the tree as "the largest I measured" in a report for Charles S. Sargent, the Harvard botanist.

Gallery

See also
List of giant sequoia groves
Hume-Bennett Lumber Company
Nelder Grove - a giant sequoia grove that was logged extensively in the 19th century.

Bibliography

 
 
 
 McGee, Lizzie. Mills of the Sequoias, Visalia, California, Tulare County Historical Society, Historical Bulletin, March 1952

References

Giant sequoia groves
Giant Sequoia National Monument
Protected areas of Fresno County, California
Sequoia National Forest